The White House Political Director, formally the White House Director of Political Affairs or White House Director of Political Strategy and Outreach, is a political appointee of the President of the United States and a senior member of the Executive Office of the President of the United States.

History
The White House Office of Political Affairs was first formally established in 1981 during under Ronald Reagan, while Jimmy Carter was the first to designate a political director in 1978.

Subsequent administrations have rebranded the office. During his second term, President Obama renamed the office as the Office of Political Strategy and Outreach, though the roles and responsibilities of the office and its director remained.

List

Political and Intergovernmental Affairs
During the second term of the Reagan administration, there was a director of political and intergovernmental affairs who sat above the political director.

In popular culture

Paulo Costanzo portrays Lyor Boone, the fictional White House Political Director, in Designated Survivor, a political thriller television series.

References

Executive Office of the President of the United States
White House Directors of Speechwriting
White House
White House Office